Cymbiolacca is a small taxonomic genus of medium-sized predatory marine gastropod mollusc in the family Volutidae, the volutes. This genus is often treated as a subgenus of Cymbiola Swainson, 1831.

Distribution
Cymbiolacca species live in colonies on and near the Great Barrier Reef, Queensland Australia, and on reefs in the Coral Sea. They live in coral sand substrates on intertidal reef platforms to depths of over 100 m. Populations or colonies of Cymbiolacca are usually narrowly endemic.

Shell description
The shells of Cymbiolacca have a small conical (usually ribbed) protoconch, a solid glossy shell with a spiny shoulder (sometimes reduced) and an elongate aperture with 4 distinct columellar plicae. The colour pattern of Cymbiolacca is polymorphic, the base colour is white and it is usually overlaid with axial lines, dashes or dots and a pink, orange, red or brown tented pattern.

The largest species (reaching 140 mm in length) are Cymbiolacca thatcheri from reeftops in the Coral Sea and a population of Cymbiolacca intruderi from deep water outside the Great Barrier Reef north east of Townsville. The most widespread and polymorphic species is Cymbiolacca pulchra from the Great Barrier Reef.

Biology
Cymbiolacca are mostly nocturnal and prey on other gastropods. During the day they remain buried in coral sand. At night the emerge and crawl on top of the sand searching for prey. They envelop prey with their colourful foot and bury in the sand to consume it. Like other Volutidae Cymbiolacca have internal fertilization and lay eggs from which snail develop directly. There is no pelagic stage. This has resulted in a wide variety of forms, each endemic to a particular population.

Taxonomy
The polymorphic, narrowly endemic populations of Cymbiolacca have caused some taxonomists to apply many names at the species and subspecific levels to this genus. Further studies of the phylogeny of this group may be able to resolve this issue and provide a stable taxonomy.

References

 Bail P. & Limpus A. (1998). The "pulchra complex". Evolver, Rome, .
 Wilson B. (1994). Australian marine shells 2. Odyssey Publishing, Kallaroo, Western Australia, 

Volutidae